Pradip Humagain is an American soccer manager who currently is serving as coach of Church Boys United & former head coach of Nepal national football team. In 2020, Humagain gave up Nepalese citizenship to became American Citizen and switched his nationality.

References

1980 births
American soccer coaches
Nepalese emigrants to the United States
People from Pennsylvania
Expatriate football managers in Nepal
Living people
Nepal national football team managers
American expatriate sportspeople in Nepal
American expatriate soccer coaches